David Dawson may refer to:

 David Dawson (painter) (born 1960), British artist
 David Dawson (choreographer) (born 1972), British choreographer
 David Dawson (politician) (born 1973), Iowa State Representative
 David Dawson (actor) (born 1982), English actor
 David Dawson (cricketer) (born 1982), Australian cricketer
 David Stewart Dawson (1849–1932), Australian manufacturing jeweler and property tycoon
 David Thomas Dawson (1957–2006), American convicted murderer

See also  
 Dawson (surname)